Gorbachevo is a rural locality (a village) in Verkhneshardengskoye Rural Settlement, Velikoustyugsky District, Vologda Oblast, Russia. The population was 190 as of 2002.

Geography 
Gorbachevo is located 49 km south of Veliky Ustyug (the district's administrative centre) by road. Verkhnyaya Shardenga is the nearest rural locality.

References 

Rural localities in Velikoustyugsky District